Jodi is an upcoming Indian Punjabi-language romantic-comedy period film written and directed by Amberdeep Singh. It is co-produced by Amrinder Gill and Karaj Gill under Rhythm Boyz Entertainment with Dalmora Films and, Diljit Dosanjh under Dosanjhwala Productions. The film stars Dosanjh and Nimrat Khaira.

Dosanjh started working on music of the film in August 2019, and its filming began on 5 October 2019. The film was scheduled to be released on 26 June 2020 but it was postponed due to COVID-19 pandemic. The film was scheduled for release on 24 June 2021, but was postponed due to COVID-19. Now it is slated to release on 5 May 2023.

Cast 
 Diljit Dosanjh 
 Nimrat Khaira
 Gurshabad
 Hardeep Gill
 Harsimran
 Drishti Grewal

Production 

Amberdeep Singh started working on Jodi in 2011, and was announced by him in December 2018. Singh and Gurpreet Singh Palheri developed the film and joined Rhythm Boyz Entertainment to produce. Karaj Gill in an interview disclosed that the film was discussed every time before their another films. On 30 January 2019, Diljit Dosanjh was confirmed as a lead actor. Dosanjh started working on music of the film in August 2019. Also, he disclosed that Amrinder Gill is a producer, but he would not be seen on the screen for this film. Principal photography of the film was scheduled to begin in September–October, and finally began on 5 October 2019, where Sandeep Patil served as cinematographer. First schedule of the filming was completed on 29 November 2019. Nimrat Khaira was confirmed as a lead actress. Drishti Grewal was also confirmed as the part of the film.

Soundtrack 
The soundtrack of the film  contains 15 songs composed by Tru Skool and lyrics are penned by Happy Raikoti , Raj Ranjodh, Arjan Dhillon and many more.

Release and marketing 
Jodi was announced by Amberdeep Singh in December 2018 on his social media handle, following the release of Bhajjo Veero Ve. In January 2019, the title poster of the film was released revealing Diljit Dosanjh as a lead actor and producer along with Amrinder Gill and Karaj Gill. Also, the poster was released along a caption "Punjabi Cinema Zindabaad" which means "Long Live Punjabi Cinema". The film was initially scheduled to be released in 2019 but was postponed to 26 June 2020. It was again postponed due to COVID-19 pandemic. Now the film is slated to release on 5 May 2023.

References

External links 
 

Upcoming Indian films
Indian romantic comedy films
Punjabi-language Indian films
Films postponed due to the COVID-19 pandemic
Unreleased Indian films